Wilfried Lieck is a male former international table tennis player from Germany.

He won a silver medal at the 1969 World Table Tennis Championships in the Swaythling Cup (men's team event) with Martin Ness, Bernt Jansen and Eberhard Schöler for West Germany.

He also won two European Table Tennis Championships medals.

See also
 List of table tennis players
 List of World Table Tennis Championships medalists

References

German male table tennis players
1945 births
Living people
World Table Tennis Championships medalists